The brassy-breasted tanager (Tangara desmaresti) is a species of bird in the family Thraupidae. It is endemic to Brazil. Its natural habitat is subtropical or tropical moist montane forests.

Taxonomy and systematics 
The brassy-breasted tanager was first described as Tangara desmaresti by Louis Vieillot in 1819 on the basis of a specimen from Brazil. The generic name Tangara is from the Tupí word tangara, meaning 'dancer'. The specific epithet desmaresti is a patronym in honor of Anselme Gaëtan Desmarest, who wrote the book Histoire des Tangaras.

References

Birds of the Atlantic Forest
Tangara (genus)
Birds described in 1819
Endemic birds of Brazil
Taxa named by Louis Jean Pierre Vieillot
Taxonomy articles created by Polbot